Ndidi Dike was born in 1960 in London. She is a Nigeria-based visual artist working in sculpture and mixed-media painting. She is one of Nigeria's leading female artists.She is from Amaokwe Item in Bende local government of Abia State. She has 3 living sisters

Biography 
Ndidi Dike first became interested in art as a very young child taking art classes in primary school. She completed her secondary education in England, and further explore her creativity in interdisciplinary art classes. "I loved the sense of freedom of interpretation, of exploring different media and I always felt a sense of peace during creative processes and so existed in a world of my own." 
Ndidi Dike graduated from the University of Nigeria, Nsukka, with a Diploma in Music Education (voice), followed by a B.A in Fine and Applied Arts in 1984 where she major in Mixed Media Painting. After her mandatory year in the National Youth Service, Dike make the choice of becoming a professional studio artist in her home of Owerri in Imo State Nigeria. The artwork she created while in service was the majority of work she put in her first solo exhibition, titled "Mixed Media Expose, 1986". Dike is a member of the Guild of Fine Arts, Nigeria (GFAN), and the Society of Nigerian Artists (SNA).

Exhibitions 
Dike had ten solo exhibitions between 1986 and 2002; and 57 group exhibitions between 1986 and 2005. She has participated in exhibitions in Nigeria, Africa, and internationally.  Among these exhibitions are Women to Women, Weaving Cultures, Shaping History (2000), University Art Gallery, Indiana State University; Totems and Signpost, (2002),  Goethe Institute, Lagos (solo), Seven Stories about Modern Art in Africa (1995), and Whitechapel Gallery, London. She had two solo exhibitions in Lagos in 2008, which include Tapestry of Life: New Beginnings at the National Museum; and Waka-into-Bondage: The Last ¾ Mile for CCA. Waka-into-Bondage was curated by Bisi Silva. This exhibition commemorated the 200th anniversary of the abolition of slave trading, which was ignored within the cultural calendar of Nigeria. Through her works in Waka-into-Bondage, Ndidi Dike sought to keep alive the memory of the epochal matter that led to the capture, enslavement, killing or death of some 21 million Africans.

In a conversation with curator Bisi Silva about this exhibition, Dike said: "I visited Badagry in 2002 to see the slave route through which large numbers of our people were sent to the Americas to work daily, for long hours on plantations under subhuman conditions. During that visit, I knew I was standing face to face with history. Yet, much as I wanted to go back sooner, it only happened in 2007 at which point I knew I wanted to capture in a dramatic visual form this cataclysmic episode in human history. No-one can visit Badagry without being moved by this ignoble part of our history or by the consequences of man’s inhumanity." Dike’s experimentation with form led to the sculptural offering "Dwellings, Doors and Windows" in which she appropriated harbour pallets; she then broke them down to reconfigure the materials in a manner that evoked the Middle Passage. Blood is a striking motif of the sculpture, and Dike explains: "The blood represents what was shed before, during and after the Trans-Atlantic trade, but also what continues to be shed today." – 

Although slavery is no longer legal anywhere in the world, human trafficking remains an international problem and an estimated 29.8 million persons are living in illegal slavery today. In modern times, the trading of children has been reported in modern Nigeria. Dike announced in an interview after her 2008 exhibition that she aimed to further explore this issue in her future works: "As I stated earlier, slave trading may have been abolished by the British parliament 200 years ago, but it is still in practice in certain countries. There are so many countries where the condition of the Black people leaves much to be desired. These new forms of slavery are not yet captured in the current works. I hope to reflect them soon in another set of works."

More recent exhibitions include Unknown Pleasures and Competing Tendencies; National Museum Onikan, Lagos (2012); Biennale Jogja XIII Hacking Conflict Indonesia meets Nigeria (2015); State Of The Nation, new works and installations, National Museum Onikan, Lagos (2016); Constellations: Floating Space, Motion and Remembrance, Iwalewahaus Bayreuth, Germany (2017); In The Guise of Resource Control, VillaVasslieff, Paris (2017); Ex-Africa, Centro Cultural Banco do Brasil (2017–2018); Belo Horizonte Brasil: Vanishing Voices 11th Bienal do Mercosul, Porto Alegre Brazil (2018); Dakart Biennale (2018); Feedback: Art, Africa and the 1980s, Iwalewahaus (2018); Prince/sses Of The City, Palais de Tokyo (2019); Lagos Biennial at Independence House, Lagos (2019).

Dike's career includes international residencies such as Ragdale Foundation (Lake Forest, Illinois, USA), Yorkshire Sculpture Park (UK), TENQ in Senegal, Africa '95 programme, Gasworks (London), Jogja Biennale XIII: Hacking Conflict 2015  (Indonesia), Iwalewahaus (Bayreuth, Germany 2018), Villa Vasilieff Penord Ricard Fellow in 2017 (Paris).

Dike's work is in public and private collections in Nigeria and abroad.

Bibliography
 Olu Oguibe, 8 African Women Artists – Savannah Gallery of Modern African Art, London, 1993.
 Catherine King : Views of Difference: Different Views of Art – Yale University Press in association with the Open University, 1999. 
 Bobin, Virginie et Bouteloup Mélanie, Ndidi Dike, Sous couvert du contrôle des ressources – in the guise of resource control, Paris, Villa Vassilieff – FNAGP Fondation Nationale des Arts Graphiques et Plastiques, 2018
 Anikulapo Jahman (ed.), Ndidi Dike: tapestry of life: new beginnings, exhibition paintings and sculpture, National Museum, Lagos, 2008

References

External links 
 
 https://web.archive.org/web/20121201082020/http://www.pau.edu.ng/museum/
 http://ktpress.co.uk/nparadoxa-issue-details.asp?issueid=4
 http://artspeakafrica.blogspot.com/2008/02/ndidi-dike-opens-at-centre-for.html
 http://jesscastellote.wordpress.com/2008/02/26/ndidi-dike-at-cca-lagos/

Living people
Artists from London
Artists from Lagos
University of Nigeria alumni
Nigerian women sculptors
Nigerian women artists
21st-century women artists
1960 births